Nicholas Heiner (born 20 April 1989 in Enkhuizen) is a sailor from the Netherlands.

He is the 2014 World Champion in Laser.

He represented the Netherlands at the 2020 Summer Olympics, placing 4th in the Finn event.

References

External links
 
 

1989 births
Living people
Dutch male sailors (sport)
Olympic sailors of the Netherlands
Sailors at the 2020 Summer Olympics – Finn
People from Enkhuizen
Sportspeople from North Holland